The 2012 FEI Nations Cup was the 2012 edition of the FEI Nations Cup, a premier international team Grand Prix show jumping competition run by the FEI. It was held at eight European venues from May 11 concluding in Dublin on August 17, 2012.
Germany retained the title they won in 2011.

2012 show schedule

Standings 
At the end of the season, the two teams with the lowest points will be relegated to the 2013 FEI Nations Cup Promotional League.

Sweden wins through in three-round thriller at Falsterbo, FEI press release with Standings after six competitions]

External links 
Official website
FEI YouTube channel with news from the events of the 2012 FEI Nations Cup
results of the 2012 FEI Nations Cup events (without the CHIO Aachen)